"Like It Like That" is the second single by hip hop group A Tribe Called Quest, from their album The Love Movement. The single was released solely as a promo-copy, had no music video, and received minimal radio airplay, being the only Tribe single not to reach any Billboard chart.

Track listing

12" single
A-side
"Like It Like That" (Radio Version)
"Like It Like That" (Album Version)
"Like It Like That" (Instrumental)

B-side
"Pad & Pen" (featuring D-Life) (Radio Version)
"Pad & Pen" (featuring D-Life) (Album Version)
"Pad & Pen" (Instrumental)

Reception
Matt Kimmel of Western High School from Florida (via Sun-Sentinel) called this song his "personal favorite" and "a perfect jam that shows the group's true essence." He also wrote, "Smooth vocals, smart lyrics and amazing beats take your ears on a journey." The song was listed on the CMJ New Music Report Beat Box top 40 chart for at least twelve weeks as of March 1, 1999. It peaked at number ten.

References

1998 singles
A Tribe Called Quest songs
1998 songs
Jive Records singles
Song recordings produced by Q-Tip (musician)
Song recordings produced by the Ummah
Songs written by Q-Tip (musician)
Songs written by Ali Shaheed Muhammad
Songs written by Phife Dawg